Nicotine is a chemical compound.

Nicotine may also refer to:

 Nicotine (novel), a 2016 novel by Nell Zink
 Nicotine (band), an Indian heavy metal band
 Nicotine (album), a 2020 album by Trevor Daniel, or the title song
 Nicotine Records, a record label
 "Nicotine", a 2013 song by Panic! at the Disco from Too Weird to Live, Too Rare to Die!
 Nicotine, a client of the file-sharing software Soulseek

See also
 Nicotinic acid, or niacin
 Nicotine gum
 Nicotine patch
 Nicotine poisoning